Mikšić or Miksic is a Croatian surname. Notable people with the surname include:
Boris Mikšić (born 1948), Croatian businessman and politician
John N. Miksic (born 1946), American archaeologist

Croatian surnames